Irena Milnikiel (8 December 1933 – 12 January 1989) was a Polish swimmer. She competed in the women's 400 metre freestyle at the 1952 Summer Olympics.

References

External links
 

1933 births
1989 deaths
Olympic swimmers of Poland
Swimmers at the 1952 Summer Olympics
People from Skarżysko County
Polish female freestyle swimmers
20th-century Polish women